The election to the United States House of Representatives in Florida was held on November 8, 1870 for the 42nd Congress, the last election in which Florida had a single Representative.

Background
Florida had been readmitted to the Union following Reconstruction in 1868, with representation starting July 1, 1868

Initial election results

Results

Contested election
The election was contested, and on January 29, 1873, Niblack was declared the winner of the 1870 election and was seated in Congress.

Results

See also
United States House of Representatives elections, 1870

References

1870
Florida
United States House of Representatives